Waseca Municipal Airport  is a public airport located two miles (3 km) west of the central business district of Waseca, in Waseca County, Minnesota, United States. It is owned by the City of Waseca.

Waseca's first airport was located south of the city and was built in the 1930s.  This airport was sold to a private owner and eventually closed.  The current airport is two miles west of the city and opened in 1969 with a turf runway and an aircraft parking apron. The Arrivals and Departures building was opened in 1972.  The runway was paved and lighted in 1975.

Although most U.S. airports use the same three-letter location identifier for the FAA and IATA, Waseca Municipal Airport is assigned ACQ by the FAA but has no designation from the IATA.

Facilities and aircraft 
For the 12-month period ending August 31, 2006, the airport had 12,500 aircraft operations, an average of 34 per day, 100% of which were general aviation.

References

External links 

Airports in Minnesota
Buildings and structures in Waseca County, Minnesota
Transportation in Waseca County, Minnesota